Davenport Library may refer to:

Davenport Public Library, Davenport, Iowa
Davenport Library (Bath, New York)